Coláiste Ailigh in County Donegal, Ireland, is a Gaelcholáiste (a secondary school offering a curriculum taught through the Irish language). Formerly located at Sprackburn House in Letterkenny, it opened in 2000, becoming the VEC's third All-Irish School. Pupils from the surrounding areas of Carrigart, Termon and Strabane also enrolled in the school.

The Government of Ireland allowed it to build a new school in 2008; this was completed by November 2013. It includes a gym, sport hall, cafeteria and full-sized Gaelic football pitch. Built to hold 350 students, the school currently has about 270 students. Its principal is Micheál Ó Giobúin.

In 2007 the school received a €2,000 prize for PE equipment for at the active School Awards held in The Helix in Dublin. It was one of only two schools in Donegal to avail of the funds, the other being Moville Community College. Awards were presented based on achievements in placing PE, physical activity and sport to the forefront during Active School Week and during the school year. It also takes part in the Young Scientist and Technology Exhibition and has won many prizes, (for example, the 2010 second place in the junior groups category for biological and ecological sciences and second place in senior individual social and behavioural sciences).

References

External links
 Coláiste Ailigh on Donegal VEC

2000 establishments in Ireland
Educational institutions established in 2000
Gaelcholáiste
Irish-language schools and college
Schools in Letterkenny
Secondary schools in County Donegal